The 2019 OKC Energy FC season is the club's sixth season of existence, and their sixth consecutive season in the USL Championship, the second tier of American soccer. Energy FC will also take part in the U.S. Open Cup. The season covers the period from October 14, 2018, to the beginning of the 2020 USLC season.

Roster

Non-competitive

Preseason

Competitions

USL Championship

Standings

Results summary

Results by round

Match results

U.S. Open Cup

As a member of the USL Championship, OKC Energy will enter the tournament in the Second Round, to be played May 14, 2019

Statistics

Appearances and goals

Disciplinary record

Clean sheets

Transfers

Out

Kits

See also
 OKC Energy FC
 2019 in American soccer
 2019 USL Championship season

References

OKC Energy FC seasons
OKC Energy
OKC Energy
OKC Energy